Hans Hillel Rousseau (born 16 June 1995) is a Haitian-Ameican tennis player.

Rousseau has a career high ATP singles ranking of 1485 achieved on 23 May 2022. He also has a career high ATP doubles ranking of 1097 achieved on 9 May 2022.

Rousseau represented Haiti at the Davis Cup, where he has a W/L record of 0–4. Rousseau also survived the 2010 Haiti earthquake and helped lead Felix Varela Senior High School to success.

References

External links

1995 births
Living people
Haitian male tennis players
American male tennis players
Tennis players from Miami